Johann Adam Heckel (14 July 1812 in Adorf – 13 April 1877 in Biebrich) was a German instrument maker. He founded the family firm in Wiesbaden-Biebrich in 1831, and became the foremost German bassoon maker, making many improvements to the instrument. His company, Wilhelm Heckel GmbH, is still regarded as one of the top makers of bassoons in the world today. The company also makes contrabassoons and heckelphones.

References

German musical instrument makers
1812 births
1877 deaths
People from Wiesbaden